Perry School is a historic school complex located near Centerville, Franklin County, North Carolina.  The complex consists of four buildings: a one-story Colonial Revival style frame school (1941); a one-story, gable-roofed detached concrete block rear wing (1949); a low-slung, U-shaped, one-story, brick high school(1952); and the roughly rectangular, gable-roofed brick gymtorium (1963).  The complex also includes the baseball field and two sets of paired brick pillars erected by two graduating classes.  The complex was built to serve the educational needs of the African-American population of Franklin County and is one of a few remaining Jim Crow-era schools in the county.  The original school was built with funds provided by the Public Works Administration (PWA). The Perry School closed in 1968 as a result of integration.

It was listed on the National Register of Historic Places in 2011.

References

African-American history of North Carolina
Public Works Administration in North Carolina
School buildings on the National Register of Historic Places in North Carolina
Colonial Revival architecture in North Carolina
School buildings completed in 1941
Education in Franklin County, North Carolina
National Register of Historic Places in Franklin County, North Carolina